Marije van Hunenstijn (born 2 March 1995) is a Dutch sprinter. She won a silver medal in the 4 × 100 metres relay at the 2018 European Championships.

In her youth she trained for gymnastics before turning to athletics at the age of 13.

International competitions

1Did not finish in the final

Personal bests
Outdoor
100 metres – 11.13  (+1.9 m/s, La Chaux-de-Fonds 2019)
200 metres – 23.25 (+0.0 m/s, Bruxelles 2019)
Indoor
60 metres – 7.34 (Karlsruhe 2019)

References

1995 births
Living people
Dutch female sprinters
Sportspeople from Apeldoorn
Athletes (track and field) at the 2020 Summer Olympics
Olympic female sprinters
Olympic athletes of the Netherlands
20th-century Dutch women
21st-century Dutch women